The Monument to Columbus (Spanish: Monumento a Colón) is a monument in Madrid, Spain. It lies on the namesake square, the Plaza de Colón. The basement of the monument is a Gothic revival work by Arturo Mélida while the topping statue is a work by Jerónimo Suñol.

History and description 
The original idea to create a national monument to commemorate Christopher Columbus was promoted by Isabella II in 1864, yet the 1868 Glorious Revolution aborted the project. Later in time, the idea was resumed as the project could serve as commemoration of the upcoming marriage between Alfonso XII and María de las Mercedes. A public contest for the project took place in 1877, and the winner was Arturo Mélida. Following the scrapping of an earlier draft, the 17-metre high basement was built from 1881 to 1885. It was intended to be inaugurated on 4 January 1886, yet the death of the monarch aborted the event.

The 3.30 m high statue, a work in Carrara marble by Jerónimo Suñol featuring Columbus holding a flag of Castile, was delivered to the Ayuntamiento de Madrid in 1892.

It returned to its original location in 2009, in the context of the renovation of the Prado–Recoletos axis.

References 
Citations

Bibliography
 
 
 
 

Monuments and memorials in Madrid
Outdoor sculptures in Madrid
Sculptures of men in Spain
Statues of Christopher Columbus
Gothic Revival architecture in Madrid
Monuments and memorials to Christopher Columbus
Buildings and structures in Recoletos neighborhood, Madrid
Monumental columns in Spain
Flags in art
Relocated buildings and structures